Rougham Airfield, formerly Royal Air Force Station Bury St Edmunds or more simply RAF Bury St Edmunds is a former Royal Air Force station located  east of Bury St Edmunds, Suffolk, England. It is not to be confused with the RAF grass strip on the western side of Bury St Edmunds known as RAF Westley, an area now part of the town itself. The airfield, now in private ownership and much reduced in size, is still active and is known as Rougham Airfield.

The airfield was originally and is now again known as Rougham as it is located north of that village between the A14 and the main railway line between Bury St Edmunds and Ipswich. It was built during 1941 and 1942 with three intersecting concrete runways. The main runway of 2,000 yards was aligned approximately E–W. It saw extensive use during the Second World War.

Current use
With the end of military control, Bury St Edmunds airfield's concreted areas were broken up with most of the site being returned to agriculture.

The old technical site has been developed into the Rougham Industrial Estate. The T2 hangars are still in use, for storage. The control tower, used for many years as a private dwelling, has now been restored and is used as a museum.

The airfield, once again known as Rougham, now has two grass runways available for civil use.  Gliding and model aircraft flying are frequent and several open-air events are organised each year.

Skyward Flight Training now operate from Rougham Airfield. 

The estate have made it known that they will not be making the airfield available for aircraft operations after the 31st May 2023.

See also

List of former Royal Air Force stations

References

Citations

Bibliography

   www.controltowers.co.uk Bury St Edmunds 
 mighty8thaf.preller.us Bury St. Edmunds
 USAAS-USAAC-USAAF-USAF Aircraft Serial Numbers--1908 to present

External links

 94th Bomb Group website
 322d Bomb Group website
 Rougham Tower Association
 Rougham Airfield Underground Battle HQ photos
 First person accounts of 4 crewman's bailout from 94BG, 333BS B-17 "Pride of the Yanks" photos

Bury
Borough of St Edmundsbury
1942 establishments in England
1948 disestablishments in England